Luis Styven Vásquez Velásquez (born 29 October 2002) is a Salvadoran footballer who plays as a forward for Águila and the El Salvador national team.

Club career
Vásquez is a youth academy graduate of Águila. On 14 August 2021, he scored his first two goals of senior club career in a 4–1 league win against Atlético Marte.

International career
Vásquez is a former Salvadoran youth national team player. He was part of El Salvador squad which reached quarter-finals of 2019 CONCACAF U-17 Championship.

On 13 August 2021, Vásquez received maiden call-up to senior team. He made his senior debut on 21 August by coming on as a 62nd minute substitute for Erick Rivera in a goalless friendly match against Costa Rica.

Career statistics

Club

International

References

External links
 

2002 births
Living people
Association football forwards
Salvadoran footballers
El Salvador youth international footballers
El Salvador international footballers
Salvadoran Primera División players
C.D. Águila footballers